The statue of Wenceslaus I is an outdoor sculpture by Josef Kamil Böhm, installed on the south side of the Charles Bridge in Prague, Czech Republic.

External links

 

Christian sculptures
Monuments and memorials in Prague
Sculptures of men in Prague
Wenceslas I
Statues on the Charles Bridge